Project Fanboy (PF) is an American website that publishes news, interviews and reviews about the American comic book industry. In addition, the site is host to comic book fan-voted awards. It was founded by Stephen Jondrew and Scott Williams in the fall of 2005 as an alternative site that covers mainstream comic book news, but also promotes smaller independent works.

History 
The Project Fanboy website was launched in 2005 as an independently run promoter of comic books and creators in the comic book industry. A little known site in its first three years, it eventually began publishing interviews and reviews of independent comic books in 2008. The site garnered little interest until May 2008, with the introduction of the annual Project Fanboy Awards.

At the 2009 MegaCon comic book convention the winners of the 2008 Project Fanboy Awards were announced. The awards sparked controversy amongst comic book fans with the announcement of Jim Balent's company Broadsword Comics receiving three of the twenty five awards, for their publication Tarot: Witch of the Black Rose. Websites such as Chris's Invincible Super-Blog published sarcastic praise concerning the outcome of the awards while other websites such as Panels on Pages spoke highly of the publication which is quoted as saying, "...making it easy to see how it walked away with three of the twenty-five awards at Project Fanboy this past March...".

In the 55th issue of Tarot: Witch of the Black Rose, Broadsword colorist, Holly Golightly appeared adorned in only the three Project Fanboy Awards the company received, again sparking the attention of bloggers and internet users. ComicBitsOnline spoke with Holly GoLightly after the awards ceremony and showcased a photo of the Broadsword team accepting the Project Fanboy Awards in the interview the site published.

Fanboy Buzz 
In 2010 the site started its official comic book podcast, the Fanboy Buzz. In 2011 the podcast partnered with the website Comic Collector Live, making the Fanboy Buzz the official podcast of both Project Fanboy and Comic Collector Live.

In February 2012 Project Fanboy and the Fanboy Buzz sites merged and continued all operations under the Fanboy Buzz banner.

On November 10, 2012, DC Comics artist Ethan Van Sciver announced his intentions of joining the Fanboy Buzz podcast as a host on the show via his Facebook Page and Twitter pages. Van Sciver joined veteran Fanboy Buzz hosts Stephen Jondrew, Scott Williams, Jean Sebastien Heroux and Steve Boyd as a full-time host of the Fanboy Buzz podcast starting with episode 142 of the show.

Usage as a comic book resource 
Comic book editor, writer, and Project Fanboy columnist, Steven D. Forbes is commonly known for his ongoing columns at the site, where he offers advice for aspiring writers as well as offering his professional editorial thoughts on samples of work sent to him by his readers. An established columnist on the site since August 2008, Forbes was interviewed on Jazma Online and has been referenced on sites such as Newsarama, by columnist Randal Jarrell, and Tyler James. Forbes has also been spoken highly of on Today.com/2008/09/27/a-site-for-the-comic-geek-in-all-of-us/ by Stacey David, author of the Bluewater Publishing mini-series GearZ.

In May 2009, the site began being used by the industry as a resource when interviews the site conducted with The Original Nutty Funsters author, Stephanie O'Donnell and Chumble Spuzz author, Ethan Nicolle were cited by the comic book news website Broken Frontier, as a primer to "inter-reviews" they conducted with the same authors.

The site has also appeared as a reference on the Internet Movie Database for an interview they conducted with Teenage Mutant Ninja Turtles co-creator, Peter Laird.

In the news and other media
Articles about the Project Fanboy website have appeared on Indy Comics Today as well as the e-newsletter for the Diamond Comic Distributors owned, Diamond International Galleries. Widely known for its reviews of Indy titles, excerpts of the site's reviews have been quoted on the back of numerous trade paper back comics and appeared on comic book news sites such as Comic Book Resources, Newsarama, and Comics Bulletin. The comic book awards the site is host to are listed as one of the main events for the MegaCon Convention in an article on the Comic Book Conventions website and is currently in its second year.

Project Fanboy Awards 
The site is host to the annual event, the Project Fanboy Awards (PFA), which is a fan voted competition similar to the Eagle Awards, where fans decide their favorite writers and artists among several other categories. Geoff Johns' inclusion in a list of the "Top 20 Comic Book Writers of All Time" in an article on Mania.com, was influenced at least in part by the 2008 award he won from the site as "Best Writer".

The PFA began as a monthly honor for deserving fan sites. The Green Lantern Corps fan site was the first winner when it received the award for February, 2008. In May 2008 however, the Project Fanboy Award was restructured and re slated as an annual event and dubbed the Project Fanboy Awards(plural). After the restructuring of the awards it now consisted of twenty-five different categories in which fans are encouraged to nominate and vote on via the Project Fanboy website.

In its first year, nominations in all categories were accepted until November 1, at which point voting began which lasted through the end of December. The same voting and nomination schedule as used for the 2008 awards also applies to following years.

2008 categories

Winners of the 2008 awards were announced Sunday, March 1, 2009, at the MegaCon comic book convention in Orlando, Florida. Winners were given commemorative award plaques descriptive in the category for which they were won. Writers from the comic book website Newsarama attended and covered the awards ceremony. Jim and Holly Balent of Broadsword Comics were also present for the ceremony and executive editor of DC Comics, Dan DiDio accepted the award plaque for Geoff Johns for Best Writer.

Following the announcement of the 2008 award winners; in March, 2009 the awards categories were amended, removing the three Best Comic Book to Movie Adaptation categories.

References

External links 
 

Entertainment Internet forums
Internet properties established in 2005
Websites about comics
American entertainment news websites